Malinniki is a rural locality (a village) in Ust-Alexeyevskoye Rural Settlement, Velikoustyugsky District, Vologda Oblast, Russia. The population was 2 as of 2002.

Geography 
Malinniki is located 57 km south of Veliky Ustyug (the district's administrative centre) by road. Ust-Alexeyevo is the nearest rural locality.

References 

Rural localities in Velikoustyugsky District